Muhammad Albicho (born 7 March 1985 in Al Qamishli, Syria) is a Syrian footballer who is currently plays for Misfat Baniyas in the Syrian Premier League.

External links 
 Profile at Goal.com
 Mohammad Albicho at Liga Indonesia
 

1985 births
Living people
Syrian footballers
Association football forwards
Syrian expatriate footballers
Syrian expatriate sportspeople in Indonesia
Kurdish sportspeople
Expatriate footballers in Indonesia
Persiba Balikpapan players
Liga 1 (Indonesia) players
Syrian Kurdish people
Syrian Premier League players